The CANT 37 was an Italian reconnaissance flying boat built by CANT in the early 1930s.

Design and development
The CANT 37 was a classic center-shaped seaplane; biplane, single-seater, and single-engine in pushing configuration. The hull was characterized by a keel with a redan and had three open cabins, one positioned on the bow with a defensive post, a central one that served as an open cockpit protected by a windshield followed by a third one also with a defensive function. Posteriormente ended in a single-sided cruciform caulking with horizontal braced planes. The wing configuration was biplane-sesquiplane, with the upper wing from the opening, mounted high to parasol, significantly larger than the lower one, the latter characterized by a sensitive angle of positive dihedral, and which integrated the floats into the lower part of the wings. Balancers and the two attacks for light bombs. The two wings were connected by a double pair of "N" uprights on each side, in the "Warren" configuration, and the upper part was supplemented by diagonal uprights connecting it to the upper part of the hull.

Specifications

References

CANT 037
1930s Italian aircraft
Flying boats